Vlastimil Moravec (7 May 1949 – 15 April 1986) was a Czech cyclist. He competed at the 1972 in Munich and 1976 Summer Olympics in Montreal in the 100 km team time trial and individual road race, respectively; he finished in 13th place in both events. He won a bronze medal at the 1975 UCI Road World Championships in the team time trial. Individually, he won the Tour de Slovaquie in 1970, the Peace Race in 1972, and the GP ZTS Dubnica nad Vahom in 1973 and 1974.

Moravec retired in 1981 and later worked as a cycling coach at the Army Sports Center in Brno. He died shortly after colliding with a truck while biking home from work. He remarried just 10 days before that, and his wife was expecting a child.

References 

1949 births
1986 deaths
Olympic cyclists of Czechoslovakia
Cyclists at the 1972 Summer Olympics
Cyclists at the 1976 Summer Olympics
Czech male cyclists
Czechoslovak male cyclists
Road incident deaths in Czechoslovakia
People from Nové Město nad Metují
Sportspeople from the Hradec Králové Region